San Benedetto Belbo is a comune (municipality) in the Province of Cuneo in the Italian region Piedmont, located about  southeast of Turin and about  northeast of Cuneo.

San Benedetto Belbo borders the following municipalities: Bossolasco, Mombarcaro, Murazzano, and Niella Belbo.

Demographic evolution

References

Cities and towns in Piedmont